Shams-i Tabrīzī or Shams al-Din Mohammad (1185–1248) was a Persian Shafi'ite poet, who is credited as the spiritual instructor of Mewlānā Jalāl ad-Dīn Muhammad Balkhi, also known as Rumi and is referenced with great reverence in Rumi's poetic collection, in particular Diwan-i Shams-i Tabrīzī (The Works of Shams of Tabriz). Tradition holds that Shams taught Rumi in seclusion in Konya for a period of forty days, before fleeing for Damascus. The tomb of Shams-i Tabrīzī was recently nominated to be a UNESCO World Heritage Site.

Life

According to Sipah Salar, a devotee and intimate friend of Rumi who spent forty days with him, Shams was the son of the Imam Ala al-Din. In a work entitled Manāqib al-'arifīn (Eulogies of the Gnostics), Aflaki names a certain 'Ali as the father of Shams-i Tabrīzī and his grandfather as Malikdad. Apparently basing his calculations on Haji Bektash Veli's Maqālāt (Conversations), Aflaki suggests that Shams arrived in Konya at the age of sixty years. However, various scholars have questioned Aflaki's reliability.

Shams received his education in Tabriz and was a disciple of Baba Kamal al-Din Jumdi. Before meeting Rumi, he apparently traveled from place to place weaving baskets and selling girdles for a living. Despite his occupation as a weaver, Shams received the epithet of "the embroiderer" (zarduz) in various biographical accounts including that of the Persian historian Dawlatshah Samarqandi. This however, is not the occupation listed by Haji Bektash Veli in the Maqālat and was rather the epithet given to the Ismaili Imam Shams al-din Muhammad, who worked as an embroiderer while living in anonymity in Tabriz. The transference of the epithet to the biography of Rumi's mentor suggests that this Imam's biography must have been known to Shams-i Tabrīzī's biographers. The specificities of how this transference occurred, however, are not yet known.

Shams' first encounter with Rumi
On 15 November 1244, a man in a black suit from head to toe came to the famous inn of Sugar Merchants of Konya. His name was Shams Tabrizi. He was claiming to be a travelling merchant. As it was said in Haji Bektash Veli's book, "Makalat", he was looking for something which he was going to find in Konya. Eventually he found Rumi riding a horse.

One day Rumi was reading next to a large stack of books. Shams Tabriz, passing by, asked him, "What are you doing?" Rumi scoffingly replied, "Something you cannot understand." (This is knowledge that cannot be understood by the unlearned.) On hearing this, Shams threw the stack of books into a nearby pool of water. Rumi hastily rescued the books and to his surprise they were all dry. Rumi then asked Shams, "What is this?" To which Shams replied, "Mowlana, this is what you cannot understand." (This is knowledge that cannot be understood by the learned.)

A second version of the tale has Shams passing by Rumi who again is reading a book. Rumi regards him as an uneducated stranger. Shams asks Rumi what he is doing, to which Rumi replies, "Something that you do not understand!" At that moment, the books suddenly catch fire and Rumi asks Shams to explain what happened. His reply was, "Something you do not understand."

Another version of the first encounter is this: In the marketplace of Konya, amid the cotton stalls, sugar vendors, and vegetable stands, Rumi rode through the street, surrounded by his students.  Shams caught hold of the reins of his donkey and rudely challenged the master with two questions.  "Who was the greater mystic, Bayazid [a Sufi saint] or Muhammad?” Shams demanded.  "What a strange question!  Muhammad is greater than all the saints," Rumi replied.  "So, why is it then that Muhammad said to God, 'I didn't know you as I should have,' while Bayazid proclaimed, 'Glory be to me!  How exalted is my Glory! [that is, he claimed the station of God himself]?"  Rumi explained that Muhammad was the greater of the two, because Bayazid could be filled to capacity by a single experience of divine blessings.  He lost himself completely and was filled with God.  Muhammad's capacity was unlimited and could never be filled.  His desire was endless, and he was always thirsty.  With every moment he came closer to God, and then regretted his former distant state.  For that reason he said, "I have never known you as I should have".  It is recorded that after this exchange of words, Rumi felt a window open at the top of his head and saw smoke rise to heaven.  He cried out, fell to the ground, and lost consciousness for one hour.  Shams, upon hearing these answers, realized that he was face to face with the object of his longing, the one he had prayed God to send him.  When Rumi awoke, he took Shams's hand, and the two of them returned to Rumi's school together on foot.

After several years with Rumi in Konya, Shams left and settled in Khoy. As the years passed, Rumi attributed more and more of his own poetry to Shams as a sign of love for his departed friend and master. In Rumi's poetry Shams becomes a guide of Allah's (Creator) love for mankind; Shams was a sun ("Shams" means "Sun" in Arabic) shining the Light of Sun as guide for the right path dispelling darkness in Rumi's heart, mind, and body on earth. The source of Shams' teachings was the knowledge of Ali ibn Abu Talib, who is also called the father of sufism.

Death
According to contemporary Sufi tradition, Shams Tabrizi mysteriously disappeared: some say he was killed by close disciples of Mowlana Jalaluddin Rumi who were jealous of the close relationship between Rumi and Shams, but according to many certain evidences, he left Konya and died in Khoy where he was buried. Sultan Walad, Rumi's son, in his Walad-Nama mathnawi just mentions that Shams mysteriously disappeared from Konya with no more specific details.

Shams Tabrizi's tomb in Khoy, beside a tower monument in a memorial park, has been nominated as a World Cultural Heritage Center by UNESCO.

Discourse of Shams Tabrīzī
The Maqalat-e Shams-e Tabrizi (Discourse of Shams-i Tabrīzī) is a Persian prose book written by Shams. The Maqalat seems to have been written during the later years of Shams, as he speaks of himself as an old man. Overall, it bears a mystical interpretation of Islam and contains spiritual advice.
Some excerpts from the Maqalat provide insight into the thoughts of Shams:

 Blessing is excess, so to speak, an excess of everything. Don't be content with being a faqih (religious scholar), say I want more – more than being a Sufi (a mystic), more than being a mystic – more than each thing that comes before you.
 A good man complains of no-one; he does not look to faults.
 Joy is like pure clear water; wherever it flows, wondrous blossoms grow…Sorrow is like a black flood; wherever it flows it wilts the blossoms.
 And the Persian language, how did it happen? With so much elegance and goodness such that the meanings and elegance that is found in the Persian language is not found in Arabic.The meaning of the Book of God is not the text, it is the man who guides. He is the Book of God, he is its verses, he is scripture.An array of mystical poetry, laden with devotional sentiments and strong 'Alid inclinations, has been attributed to Shams-i Tabrīzī across the Persian Islamic world. Scholars such as Gabrielle van den Berg have sometimes questioned whether these were really authored by Shams-i Tabrīzī. However, later scholars have pointed out that it may instead be a question of whether the name Shams-i Tabriz has been used for more than one person. Van den Berg suggests that this identification is the pen name of Rumi. However she acknowledges that, despite the large number of poems attributed to Shams, that comprise the devotional repertoire of the Ismailis of Badakhshan, an overwhelming majority of these cannot be located in any of the existing works of Rumi. Rather, as Virani observes, some of these are located in the "Rose Garden of Shams" (Gulzār-i Shams), authored by Mulukshah, a descendant of the Ismaili Pir Shams, as well as in other works.

See also

 List of Persian poets and authors
 Persian literature
 Rumi's Kimia''
 The Twelve Imams
 Sufism
 Alevism
 Haji Bektash Veli
 Rumi

References

Further reading
 Browne, E.G. A Literary History of Persia. Cambridge: University Press, 1929.
 Tabrizi, Shams-i. Me & Rumi: The Autobiography of Shams-i Tabrīzīi, edited by William C. Chittick. Louisville: Fons Vitae, 2004.
 Maleki, Farida. Shams-e Tabrizi: Rumi's Perfect Teacher. New Delhi: Science of the Soul Research Centre, 2011. 
 Rypka, Jan. History of Iranian Literature, edited by Karl Jahn. Dordrecht: Reidel, 1968.

External links

 Divan e Shames Tabrizi with Accented Words and Meaning of Difficult Words in Farsi Volume 1
 Divan e Shames Tabrizi with Accented Words and Meaning of Difficult Words in Farsi Volume 2
 Poems written by Hazrat Shams Tabrezi

1185 births
1248 deaths
Iranian Sufis
13th-century Persian-language poets
13th-century Iranian philosophers
People from Tabriz
Rumi